Slap is a village in the Vipava Valley west of the town of Vipava in the traditional Inner Carniola region of Slovenia. It is now generally regarded as part of the Slovenian Littoral.

Church

The parish church in the settlement is dedicated to Saint Matthew and belongs to the Koper Diocese.

References

External links
Slap at Geopedia

Populated places in the Municipality of Vipava